This article is about the Welsh priest. For the  interior designer and television  personality see Laurence Llewelyn-Bowen 

 Lawrence Bowen   was an Anglican priest.

He was born on 9 September 1914 and educated at Llanelli Grammar School and the  University College of Wales, Aberystwyth. He was ordained in  1938 and began his career with a curacy at  Pembrey. From 1940 to 1946 he was a Minor Canon of St David's Cathedral. From then until 1964 he was Vicar of St Clears after which he was Rector of Tenby.  In 1972 he became  Dean of St David's, a post he held for 12 years. He died on 26 September 1994.

References

1914 births
People educated at Llanelli Boys' Grammar School
Alumni of Aberystwyth University
Welsh Anglicans
Deans of St Davids
1994 deaths